Norashen is a village in the Artashat Municipality of the Ararat Province of Armenia. It is located adjacent to the ruins of the ancient city of Dvin.

References 

World Gazetteer: Armenia – World-Gazetteer.com
Kiesling, Rediscovering Armenia, p. 27, available online at the US embassy to Armenia's website

Populated places in Ararat Province
Yazidi populated places in Armenia